When Mom Is Away is a 2019 Italian comedy film directed by Alessandro Genovesi.

A Christmas-themed sequel entitled When Mom Is Away... With the Family was released in December 2020.

Cast
Fabio De Luigi as Carlo
Valentina Lodovini as Giulia
Angelica Elli as Camilla
Matteo Castellucci as Tito
Bianca Usai as Bianca
Diana Del Bufalo as Lucia 
Niccolò Senni as Alessandro Minervini
Antonio Catania as the boss
Giorgia Cardaci as Adele

References

External links
 

2019 comedy films
Italian comedy films
2010s Italian-language films
Films directed by Alessandro Genovesi
Films set in Rome
2010s Italian films